Aberdeen station, also known as the Burlington Northern Depot, is a historic Burlington Northern train station at 1 Court Street in Aberdeen, South Dakota.

It was built in 1906, designed by architect Samuel L. Bartlett, and was added to the National Register of Historic Places in 1983 as the Great Northern Railway Passenger and Freight Depot.

References

Railway stations on the National Register of Historic Places in South Dakota
Railway buildings and structures on the National Register of Historic Places in South Dakota
Railway stations in the United States opened in 1906
Buildings and structures in Aberdeen, South Dakota
Former Great Northern Railway (U.S.) stations
National Register of Historic Places in Brown County, South Dakota
Railway freight houses on the National Register of Historic Places
Former railway stations in South Dakota